Emevor is a town in Isoko North Local Government Area of Delta State, southern Nigeria.  Emevor shares boundaries with Ebor-Iyede, Agharha, Otor Owhe and Orogun. It is about 13 km to the East of Ughelli township stadium. There are two public secondary schools in the town: James Welch Grammar School Emevor and Emevor Mixed Secondary School; while the two public primary schools are Emehwa Primary school and Odion Primary School. There are other private schools in the community as well. It has two markets locally known as “Ekiedhe” and “Ekiewo”.

The traditional ruler of Emevor is known as Odion. There are however other community leaders such as president general, chairman, etc. It is historically known to be a peaceful place. The people speak a distinct Isoko language.

It is an oil producing community in the Niger Delta region

Notable people
Chief Mrs. Betty Oghometite Efekodha (Hon. Commissioner, Ministry Of Women Affairs, Community and Social Development) hails paternally and maternally from Emevor and Oghara-Iyede all in Isoko North Local Government Area of Delta State. Moses O. Ovrawah (Assistant Commissioner of Police), John Ekowiro (Deputy Commissioner of Police), Don Prince Victor Ovrawah (Author/Activist), We also have the person of Rt hon Micheal Ogwilaya a renowned political activist the house of Assembly Member Isoko north Lga btw 1992 - 1993.(Abiola era). It's rumoured that the Ogwilaya's are the founders of Emevor clan, As they are the very descendants of Emewha and are among oletu family in Emevor.

References

https://books.google.com.ng/books?id=TMj0DwAAQBAJ&pg=PT76&lpg=PT76&dq=who+is+an+oletu+in+benin&source=bl&ots=HWH-oRLv5H&sig=ACfU3U2eWVwrGRRJWvtL6nXBmFvDbBPmfA&hl=en&sa=X&ved=2ahUKEwifvO-RkK78AhXuRKQEHV6hD704ChDoAXoECAgQAQ

https://books.google.com.ng/books?id=TMj0DwAAQBAJ&pg=PT76&lpg=PT76&dq=who+is+an+oletu+in+benin&source=bl&ots=HWH-oRLv5H&sig=ACfU3U2eWVwrGRRJWvtL6nXBmFvDbBPmfA&hl=en&sa=X&ved=2ahUKEwifvO

Populated places in Delta State